Lawson v Serco Ltd [2006] UKHL 3 is a UK labour law case, concerning the test for when workers are covered by employment rights when they work abroad.

Facts
Lawson v Serco Ltd involved three joined appeals, where the question was whether the claimants could bring cases for unfair dismissal in the UK within the Employment Rights Act 1996, given that they worked part of their time abroad. However the ERA 1996 had been amended to exclude any reference to territorial scope, and thus left the issue to the courts. The employers were arguing that claims could not be brought because the work was performed outside the UK.

Lawson worked for Serco Ltd as a security guard on Ascension Island. He was an RAF policeman before. He resigned claiming constructive dismissal. Botham worked for the Ministry of Defence as a youth worker, based in the UK, but performing various jobs in German establishments. He was dismissed for gross misconduct, but claimed this was unfair. Crofts and the other claimants worked for Veta Ltd, a Hong Kong company, as pilots. They were based in the UK under a permanent basings policy. Veta Ltd was a wholly owned subsidiary of Cathay Pacific and both companies were based in Hong Kong.

In Lawson the Court of Appeal had held that ERA 1996 section 94 had not applied to Lawson or Botham, because all services were performed by the employees abroad. This was followed by the EAT and Court of Appeal in Botham so that he was not entitled to UK rights either. In Crofts another Court of Appeal, with Lord Phillips MR dissenting, held that ERA 1996 section 94 was applicable to Crofts since under the basings policy he was based in the UK.

Judgment
The House of Lords held that Mr Lawson, Botham and Crofts were probably all entitled to make their claims in the UK, though the cases of Lawson and Botham had to be remitted to tribunal to determine the merits. Lord Hoffmann held that rights were a matter of construction, and it was mistaken to try to formulate an ancillary rule of territorial scope which must then be interpreted and applied, like ERA 1996 section 196 had been. But it was not a matter of discretion, and various principles could be set out.

Lord Woolf, Lord Rodger, Lord Walker, and Baroness Hale concurred.

See also

UK labour law

Notes

References
E McGaughey, A Casebook on Labour Law (Hart 2019) ch 4, 194

United Kingdom labour case law
House of Lords cases
2006 in case law
2006 in British law